Outriders is an Australian children's television series that first screened on the Nine Network in 2001. It was a 26 part series produced by Southern Star Entertainment.

Episodes
1. Eye of the Dragon: Part 1 (airdate July 9, 2001)
2. Eye of the Dragon: Part 2 (airdate July 10, 2001)
3. Eye of the Dragon: Part 3 (airdate July 11, 2001)
4. Eye of the Dragon: Part 4 (airdate July 12, 2001)
5. Eye of the Dragon: Part 5 (airdate July 13, 2001) 
6. Eye of the Dragon: Part 6 (airdate July 16, 2001) 
7. Ghost of the Past: Part 1 (airdate July 17, 2001)
8. Ghost of the Past: Part 2 (airdate July 18, 2001)
9. Ghost of the Past: Part 3 (airdate July 19, 2001)
10. Ghost of the Past: Part 4 (airdate July 20, 2001) 
11. Dirty Business: Part 1 (airdate July 23, 2001)
12. Dirty Business: Part 2 (airdate July 24, 2001)
13. Dirty Business: Part 3 (airdate July 25, 2001)
14. Dirty Business: Part 4 (airdate July 26, 2001)
15. Paradise Lost: Part 1 (airdate July 27, 2001)
16. Paradise Lost: Part 2 (airdate July 30, 2001)
17. Paradise Lost: Part 3 (airdate July 31, 2001)
18. Paradise Lost: Part 4 (airdate August 1, 2001)
19. Aliens: Part 1 (airdate August 2, 2001)
20. Aliens: Part 2 (airdate August 3, 2001)
21. Aliens: Part 3 (airdate August 6, 2001)
22. Aliens: Part 4 (airdate August 7, 2001)
23. Web of Lies: Part 1 (airdate August 8, 2001)
24. Web of Lies: Part 2 (airdate August 9, 2001)
25. Web of Lies: Part 3 (airdate August 10, 2001)
26. Web of Lies: Part 4 (airdate August 13, 2001)

Cast

Main Cast
 Abbie Cornish as Regina "Reggie" McDowell
 Oliver Ackland as Vince Frasca
 Mark Furze as Jake Konrad
 Kate Raison as Tori Konrad
 Luise Helm as Julia Kurtz
 Simon Scarlett as Shane Sullivan

Other Cast
 Kate Beahan as Rachel
 William Haydon as Lloyd
 Robert Mammone as Fenech
 Phaedra Nicolaidis as Mel
 Melissa Ippolito as Anissa
 Harry Pavlidis as Madigan
 Lenore Smith as Reggie's Mother
 Christopher Pitman as Glenn Miller
 Peter Sumner as Bud Sattler
 Moya O'Sullivan as Mrs. Churchill
 John Jarrat as Stuart
 Harold Hopkins as Hayden
 Miranda Hobbs as Britney Potter
 Emily Calder as The Rider
 Kellie Bright as Julia's Mother (2 episodes, 2001)
 Robert Coleby as Jansen (2 episodes, 2001)
 Diana Glenn as Constable Taylor
 John Sheerin as Mr. Sullivan

See also
 Neon Rider, a similarly themed program.
 Higher Ground, a similarly themed program.

References

Australian children's television series
Australian Broadcasting Corporation original programming
2001 Australian television series debuts
2001 Australian television series endings
Television series about teenagers
Television series by Endemol Australia
Television shows set in Berlin
Television shows set in Sydney